Vijay Kumar Shukla, also known as Munna Shukla, is a former Member of the Legislative Assembly (MLA) from Bihar. He has been elected on three occasions to the Bihar Legislative Assembly. He served a jail term for murder. He was left out of jail on bail later.

Family and education
He is the brother of Chhotan Shukla, a notorious gang member who was assassinated  in 1994, allegedly by the henchmen of Brij Bihari Prasad, a  minister belonging 
to OBC Bania caste, who was a strongman from Lalu Prasad Yadav's Rashtriya Janata Dal. His another brother  Bhutkun Shukla who was responsible for killing G. Krishnaiah, the District Magistrate (DM) of Gopalganj during Chhotan's  funeral procession and is now also dead.  His wife, Annu Shukla, is an MLA from his former seat.

Political career
Shukla was first elected a MLA from the Lalganj constituency in the 2002 as Independent Candidate. Again won in February 2005 Bihar elections as a Lok Janshakti Party candidate. In the October elections of that year he won again after switching to be a Janata Dal (United) candidate. 

Shukla later stood as an independent candidate for the Lok Sabha constituency of Vaishali. There he lost to the national vice-president of the Rashtriya Janata Dal, Raghuvansh Prasad Singh. He was debarred from election as he was convicted in the Brij Behari Prasad murder case along with Surajbhan Singh.

Crime 
The criminal careers of Shukla and of Anand Mohan Singh, both of which were intertwined with politics, ran in parallel for many years and were of equal note.  Tehelka said in 2007 that 

The two overlapped completely in 1994 at the time of the lynching of a Dalit district magistrate near to Muzaffarpur during the funeral cortege of Chhotan Shukla. In 2007 they were sentenced to death for their involvement in the murder but Shukla's sentence was later overturned on appeal, when it was determined that he was present but uninvolved, and Singh's sentence was reduced to life imprisonment.

While in jail for that offence in 2012, Shukla was studied for and was awarded a PhD by Babasaheb Bhimrao Ambedkar Bihar University.

References

Janata Dal (United) politicians
Living people
Criminals from Bihar
Indian politicians convicted of crimes
Lok Janshakti Party politicians
Politicians convicted of murder
Bihar MLAs 2005–2010
People from Vaishali district
Babasaheb Bhimrao Ambedkar Bihar University alumni
Year of birth missing (living people)